Dichagyris triphaenoides is a species of cutworm or dart moth in the family Noctuidae.

The MONA or Hodges number for Dichagyris triphaenoides is 10667.

References

Further reading

 
 
 

triphaenoides
Articles created by Qbugbot
Moths described in 1912